Androgen insufficiency syndrome is a condition most commonly affecting women, and is also called Female androgen insufficiency syndrome (FAIS), although it can happen in both sexes. It is associated with lack of energy and motivation, depression, lack of desire (libido), and in more severe cases changes in secondary sex characteristics.

References

Syndromes affecting the endocrine system
Endocrine gonad disorders